Taraki may refer to:
 Nur Muhammad Taraki, Afghan politician, president of Afghanistan from 1978 to 1979
 Tarakai, a Pashtun tribe in Afghanistan 
 Taraki Sivaram, Tamil journalist of Sri Lanka